Tsolikouri is a light yellow-skinned white grape variety grown mainly in western Imereti district of Georgia.

Out of 400 different types of grapes in the country, Tsolikouri is among the most widespread varieties. Nearly 90% of vineyards in western Georgia grow Tsolikauri. This sort usually matures by mid October. Grown in Orzhonikidze vineyards during Soviet rule of Georgia, Tsolikouri was considered one of high-quality grapes along with Chkhaveri and Izabella varieties. It has been used for production of premium dry, semi-sweet and semi-dry wines.
Tsolikauri, Kolkheti, Lelo, Tvishi wines are made from Tsolikouri grapes. According to former Soviet statesman Vyacheslav Molotov, Tsolikouri was one of favorite wines of Soviet leader, Joseph Stalin.

See also
Georgian wine

References

White wine grape varieties
Georgian wine